The Great Britain long track team is the national long track motorcycle racing team of Great Britain and is controlled by the Auto-Cycle Union ACU). The team was started in all editions of Team Long Track World Championship and they won silver medal in 2007 .
2008 - Bronze (3rd)
2009 - 4th
2010 - 4th
2011 - Bronze 3rd
2012 - Silver 2nd
2013 - Bronze 3rd
2014 - 5th
2015 - GOLD 1st
2016 - 4th

Competition

Riders
Riders who started in Team Long Track World Championship Finals:

 Andrew Appleton (2007, 2009, 2010, 2011, 2013, 2014, 2015, 2016, 2017)
 Paul Cooper (2011, 2012, 2013)
 Adam Ellis (2018), 2019)
 Mitch Godden (2007, 2008, 2011)
 Richard Hall (2008, 2009, 2010, 2012, 2013, 2014, 2015, 2016, 2017
 Chris Harris (2018, 2019)
 David Howe (2012, 2014)
 Paul Hurry (2007, 2009)
 Edward Kennett (2017, 2019)
 Vincent Kinchin (2008)
 Chris Mills (2010)
 Glen Phillips (2007, 2008, 2009, 2010, 2011, 2012, 2013, 2014, 2015, 2016)
 James Shanes (2015, 2016, 2017, 2018)
 Zach Wajtknecht (2018, 2019)

Notes
 Glen Phillips Ten appearances make his equal top all time appearances with Stephane Tresarrieu and Matheiu Tresarrieu
 Glen Phillips Third in history with 51 rides
 Glen Phillips Top in history with 17 fourth places
 David Howe has the best average of any other rider in the competition with 4.43

See also 
 Great Britain national speedway team
 Speedway in the United Kingdom

External links 
 Long track at the Auto-Cycle Union webside
 BSPA Website

National long track teams
Speedway
Speedway in the United Kingdom